Christoforos Vernardakis is a Greek academic who served as a Minister of State in the Second Cabinet of Alexis Tsipras, from 2016 to 2019. From 2015 to 2016, he served as Alternate Minister of Administrative Reform in the same Cabinet. He is an MP for Athens A constituency.

Biography
Vernardakis studied at the National and Kapodistrian University of Athens and graduated with a BA in political science, and afterwards studied in France, taking diplomas at the Sorbonne before returning to the University of Athens to take his PhD in 1995. In 1993, he founded the polling organisation VPRC, and became its president in 2004. After a term as a lecturer at the University of Crete (2004-2009), he became an assistant professor at the Aristotle University of Thessaloniki. In the January 2015 Greek legislative election he stood election for Athens A and was seated with Syriza without election.

References

National and Kapodistrian University of Athens alumni
Academic staff of the University of Crete
Academic staff of the Aristotle University of Thessaloniki
Greek MPs 2015–2019
Year of birth missing (living people)
Living people
Syriza politicians
Politicians from Athens
Greek MPs 2019–2023